Heald Green railway station serves the suburb of Heald Green in Stockport, England.

Station facilities 
Heald Green has a ticket office on Platform 1, which is open Monday-Saturday 06:15-19:30. Ticket vending machines are in place on both platforms for purchase of tickets or promise to pay coupons when the ticket office is closed and for the collection of pre-paid tickets.

Both platforms have waiting shelters with metal seating, with platform one having a station building which includes a small waiting room, ticket office and timetables. Both platforms have electronic departure boards as well as automated audio announcements. Interchange between platforms requires you to leave the station and cross over the tracks by using the road bridge at the north end of the station.

Services

References

Further reading

External links

Railway stations in the Metropolitan Borough of Stockport
DfT Category E stations
Former London and North Western Railway stations
Railway stations in Great Britain opened in 1909
Northern franchise railway stations